The Wolverhampton Grand Theatre, commonly known as The Grand, is a theatre located on Lichfield Street, Wolverhampton, UK, designed in 1894 by Architect Charles J. Phipps. It is a Grade II Listed Building with a seating capacity of 1200.

1894 - 1939
The Grand Theatre opened on 10 December 1894. It was not Wolverhampton's first theatre but has outlasted its rivals, including The Star Theatre, later known as the Theatre Royal, also Clifton Cinema in Bilston Street, The Empire Palace, and later The Hippodrome in Queen Square which was destroyed by fire in the 1950s.

The site chosen for the new building was to replace the decaying eyesore next to the Victoria Hotel, later the Britannia Hotel, in Lichfield Street, then as now, a major thoroughfare close to the city centre. The driving force behind the theatre in these early stages was Alderman Charles Tertius Mander, Mayor of Wolverhampton.

The theatre was designed by eminent theatre architect Charles J. Phipps and incorporated four shops, two on either side of the main entrance, on its 123-foot frontage. Wolverhampton builder Henry Gough was appointed to carry out the construction work, which cost at that time an estimated £10,000. Astonishingly the theatre was completed in less than six months, from the laying of foundation stone by Mrs C.T. Mander on 28 June 1894 to the grand opening on 10 December 1894. The façade of the building has hardly altered during its two major refurbishments.

The seating capacity in 1894 was a staggering 2151. In the nineteenth century, seating in the auditorium was segregated by class, with the Dress Circle reserved for the gentry. For those "ordinary" people lucky enough to get in, they watched from the gallery where seats could not be booked in advance. The interior was overwhelming with its predominant colours of cream and claret and the ornate ceiling plasterwork. The decorations adorning the box and circle fronts and proscenium arch were painted gold. The theatre, with the exception of the stage, was lit by electricity.

The D'Oyly Carte Opera Company performed Gilbert and Sullivan's Utopia, Limited on the grand opening night of 10 December 1894.

For the next few years, people enjoyed entertainment varying from large-scale musicals and Shakespeare's plays to "wholesome" dramas. Starring in such productions the Grand played host to both the famous and soon to be famous. These included Sir Henry Irving the renowned Lyceum actor and a young Charlie Chaplin who was recorded as being company call boy in 1902. Chaplain later starred at the Grand in one of his first acting debuts as Dr Watson's pageboy in Sherlock Holmes.

In 1909 the Grand was chosen for a spectacle of quite a different kind, when the president of the Board of Trade, Winston Churchill addressed the Budget League from the theatre's stage. Nine years later Prime Minister, David Lloyd George played to a full house when he opened the Government's General Election campaign.

Until the early 1920s, the Grand was a touring theatre. It had no resident corps of actors but rather played host to a huge number of visiting professional companies, and also to various local amateur groups. During the recession all this changed and the Grand became a repertory theatre, initially under the direction of Leon Salberg.

This shift in emphasis meant that the superb stage and remarkable backstage facilities became available to a whole new generation of aspiring professionals, many of whom went on to become household names. During the thirties, forties and fifties, many future stars including Kenneth More, Peggy Mount, June Whitfield and Leonard Rossiter developed their talents in front of a discerning Black Country audience. Another famous daughter of Wolverhampton, and the Grand in particular, was Gwen Berryman, who later found nationwide fame playing Doris Archer in the well known BBC Radio series The Archers.

1939 - 1980
The Second World War hit the theatre badly. Rationing and shortages of materials meant that shows became austere and it was increasingly difficult to fill the house. Although post-war euphoria brought with it increased audiences, by the fifties the days of large repertory companies were numbered. There were of course some memorable moments, such as the Grand's diamond jubilee production in 1944 of South Pacific, featuring a young Sean Connery, but by then large rep companies were dying out.

The main problem was television. Across the country, provincial theatres were losing audiences and rep companies were disbanding. The Grand avoided closure by changing its format once again and 1959 saw the return of touring companies including Michael Caine and Terence Stamp in a production of The Long, The Short and The Tall, but even these failed to counteract the steady decline in audiences.

The late fifties and sixties also saw the return of variety shows and many famous stars appeared, notably singing star David Whitfield, who had more hit records than any other recording artist in the fifties. (His last appearance at the Grand was in 1977). Eventually however in 1969, the Myatt Family, the principal shareholders were forced to sell the Grand Theatre to the local authority for £74,000. Thus ended a remarkable era - the theatre had been owned by the descendants of the original shareholders for 75 years.

The theatre underwent a small renovation in 1970, with the auditorium repainted from its old Wedgewood blue, white and gold to the new Spanish Chestnut red, white and gold. The painting was done on Sundays in August of that year, by sixty or seventy volunteers from the Grand Theatre Club and The paint was donated by Manders, and later a cheque from Bilston Operatic Society paid for the temporary scaffolding.

John Holland, a member of the Grand Theatre Club at the time, has this to say about the refurbishment:

'I was the first Hon Secretary of the Theatre Club. We decorated the entire auditorium over a weekend... Ron Howard and I continued to add touches to the paintwork for many weeks.'

The paint was donated by Manders... local paint and ink manufacturer and developers of the Mander Centre. The scaffolding too was donated... As the Saturday evening house emptied the scaffolding was walked in... By around one o'clock we were painting. We worked in shifts throughout the weekend.

Public money was needed to keep the theatre open. In order to attract funding from Arts Council England the theatre was made into a non-profit making trust, subsequently, a new company, Grand Theatre Wolverhampton Ltd, was born. The company began refurbishing the theatre in 1973, laying down a new stage, improving lighting in the building and strengthening the back wall in Berry Street. Throughout the seventies the Grand enjoyed some success with pantomime and numerous touring productions of musicals, ballet, opera and plays, but, as audiences again began to decline, the theatre was forced to close in 1980.

Fortunately, there were some Wulfrunians who recognised the need for live theatre, and immediately after the curtain fell in 1980 a public meeting was held to start a campaign to re-open the Grand. Fifty people attended the meeting and from that night the "Save the Grand Action Group" was born. Working in co-operation with Wolverhampton Borough Council, renovation work began while the council agreed that in common with other theatres of similar size, a substantial annual subsidy was required to enable the theatre operate successfully. With a grant from the Department of the Environment, the immense task of restoring the building began. The grant was awarded dependent upon the auditorium being restored to its original state. Consequently, the ceilings, boxes and proscenium arch which were painted cream and gold from the original colour scheme, while the use of claret that had predominated up until then, was restricted.

1980 - present day
Seating in the Upper Circle was redesigned, now with an overall capacity of 1200, and the existing seats were stripped and rebuilt, an induction loop was installed for the hard of hearing and ventilation systems were completely renewed. The Dress Circle was given a much more spacious area for patrons to wait before entering the auditorium; while in the foyer new glass doors helped open the theatre to the public outside.

In 1982 when the Grand re-opened it was one of the best-equipped theatres in the country. During the next ten years or so the Grand enjoyed many successes attracting the best touring companies and the theatre enjoyed by a loyal and supportive audience.

On 10 December 1994, the Grand celebrated its 100th Birthday with a gala performance from the D'Oyly Carte Opera Company. It was exactly 100 years to the day since the company had opened the Grand Theatre.

The theatre's centenary offered a new incentive to ensure the long-term viability of the theatre was secured. To this end feasibility studies were carried out to look out how the theatre could be improved to meet the ever-increasing expectations of modern theatregoers.

The country's leading theatre architects RHWL were appointed in 1997 with a brief to continue the achievements of the earlier renovation. Their task was to improve access and circulation, to install lifts and air conditioning, to update the theatre's facilities and redecorate the theatre to enhance the beautiful style and features created by Phipps. With a successful application to the National Lottery through the Arts Council of England and partnership funding from the European Regional Development Fund, the £8 million refurbishment of the Grand Theatre was completed in December 1998.

In 2014 it was confirmed that the Grand Theatre would undergo a major refurbishment as part of the Black Country Growth Deal, along with the Wolves Civic. This would help enable the theatre to stage larger scale shows.

Producing
In 2017, Wolverhampton Grand Theatre made a return to producing theatre in-house at the venue. The first production, Brassed Off from 23 August - 2 September starred Jeffrey Holland as Danny and featured both professional actors and actors from the local community. Principal cast was as follows - Ash Matthews (Shane), Chris Connel (Andy), Miriam Grace Edwards (Sandra), Clara Darcy (Gloria), Greg Yates (Jim), Tim Jones (Harry), Donna Heaslip (Rita) and Susie Wilcox (Vera).

References

External links
 

Theatres in Wolverhampton
Charles J. Phipps buildings